The Tewksbury Township Schools is a community public school district which operates two schools serving students in kindergarten through eighth grade from Tewksbury Township, in Hunterdon County, New Jersey, United States.

As of the 2018–19 school year, the district, comprised of two schools, had an enrollment of 541 students and 60.4 classroom teachers (on an FTE basis), for a student–teacher ratio of 9.0:1.

The district is classified by the New Jersey Department of Education as being in District Factor Group "J", the-highest of eight groupings. District Factor Groups organize districts statewide to allow comparison by common socioeconomic characteristics of the local districts. From lowest socioeconomic status to highest, the categories are A, B, CD, DE, FG, GH, I and J.

Public school students in ninth through twelfth grades attend Voorhees High School in Lebanon Township (although the mailing address is Glen Gardner), which also serves students from Califon Borough, Glen Gardner Borough, Hampton Borough, High Bridge Borough and Lebanon Township. As of the 2018–19 school year, the high school had an enrollment of 982 students and 83.1 classroom teachers (on an FTE basis), for a student–teacher ratio of 11.8:1. The school is part of the North Hunterdon-Voorhees Regional High School District, which also includes students from Bethlehem Township, Clinton Town, Clinton Township, Franklin Township, Lebanon Borough and Union Township who attend North Hunterdon High School in Annandale.

History
The community's original elementary school, Sawmill, opened in 1951 and was sold in 2003 for $1 million to the Hunterdon County Educational Services Commission.

Awards and recognition
Tewksbury Elementary School was recognized in 2011 as a Blue Ribbon School by the United States Department of Education.

Old Turnpike School was one of nine schools in New Jersey honored in 2020 by the National Blue Ribbon Schools Program, which recognizes high student achievement.

Schools
Schools in the district (with 2018–19 enrollment data from the National Center for Education Statistics) are: 
Elementary school
Tewksbury Elementary School with 321 students in grades PreK - 4
Kathryn Lemerich, Principal
Old Turnpike School with 214 students in grades 5 - 8
Michael Mitchell, Principal

Administration
Core members of the district's administration are:
Dr. Jennifer Shouffler, Superintendent
Lori Tirone, Business Administrator / Board Secretary

Board of education
The district's board of education, comprised of nine members, sets policy and oversees the fiscal and educational operation of the district through its administration. As a Type II school district, the board's trustees are elected directly by voters to serve three-year terms of office on a staggered basis, with three seats up for election each year held (since 2012) as part of the November general election. The board appoints a superintendent to oversee the day-to-day operation of the district.

References

External links
Tewksbury Township Schools
 
School Data for the Tewksbury Township Schools, National Center for Education Statistics
North Hunterdon-Voorhees Regional High School District

Tewksbury Township, New Jersey
New Jersey District Factor Group J
School districts in Hunterdon County, New Jersey
School districts established in 1951